The Helpmann Award for Best Male Actor in a Play is an award presented by Live Performance Australia (LPA) (the trade name for the Australian Entertainment Industry Association (AEIA)), an employers' organisation which serves as the peak body in the live entertainment and performing arts industries in Australia. The accolade is handed out at the annual Helpmann Awards, which celebrates achievements in musical theatre, contemporary music, comedy, opera, classical music, theatre, dance and physical theatre. This is a list of winners and nominations for the Helpmann Award for Best Male Actor in a Play.

Winners and nominees

Source:

See also
Helpmann Awards

Notes

A: The character in The Christian Brothers is known as the "unnamed elderly Christian Brothers’ teacher"
B: In The Blue Room Marcus Graham portrayed the male characters: Fred, Anton, Charles, Robert, Malcolm.
C: Gulpilil is an autobiographical stage production, where David Gulpilil played himself.
D: Macbeth was performed by Stephen Dillane as a one man show, who portrayed over thirty of the characters in the play.
E: Jefferson Mays portrayed an additional forty characters in I Am My Own Wife.
F: The character in The Tell-Tale Heart does not have a name.
G: Robert Menzies' character in The End doesn't have a name and is known simply as Dying Man.
H: Lucas Stibbard plays the lead roles of Thomas and Alethea, and various other characters in Boy Girl Wall.

References

External links
The official Helpmann Awards website

P
Awards for male actors